Paul Jackson Pollock (January 28, 1912August 11, 1956) was an American painter and a major figure in the abstract expressionist movement. He was widely noticed for his "drip technique" of pouring or splashing liquid household paint onto a horizontal surface, enabling him to view and paint his canvases from all angles. It was called all-over painting and action painting, since he covered the entire canvas and used the force of his whole body to paint, often in a frenetic dancing style. This extreme form of abstraction divided the critics: some praised the immediacy of the creation, while others derided the random effects. In 2016, Pollock's painting titled Number 17A was reported to have fetched US$200 million in a private purchase.

A reclusive and volatile personality, Pollock struggled with alcoholism for most of his life. In 1945, he married the artist Lee Krasner, who became an important influence on his career and on his legacy. Pollock died at the age of 44 in an alcohol-related single-car collision when he was driving. In December 1956, four months after his death, Pollock was given a memorial retrospective exhibition at the Museum of Modern Art (MoMA) in New York City. A larger, more comprehensive exhibition of his work was held there in 1967. In 1998 and 1999, his work was honored with large-scale retrospective exhibitions at MoMA and at The Tate in London.

Early life (1912–1936)
Paul Jackson Pollock was born in Cody, Wyoming, in 1912, the youngest of five brothers. His parents, Stella May (née McClure) and LeRoy Pollock, were born and grew up in Tingley, Iowa, and were educated at Tingley High School. Pollock's mother is interred at Tingley Cemetery, Ringgold County, Iowa. His father had been born with the surname McCoy, but took the surname of his adoptive parents, neighbors who adopted him after his own parents had died within a year of each other. Stella and LeRoy Pollock were Presbyterian; they were of Irish and Scots-Irish descent, respectively. LeRoy Pollock was a farmer and later a land surveyor for the government, moving for different jobs. Stella, proud of her family's heritage as weavers, made and sold dresses as a teenager. In November 1912, Stella took her sons to San Diego; Jackson was just 10 months old and would never return to Cody. He subsequently grew up in Arizona and Chico, California.

While living in the Vermont Square neighborhood of Los Angeles, he enrolled at Manual Arts High School, from which he was expelled. He had already been expelled in 1928 from another high school. During his early life, Pollock explored Native American culture while on surveying trips with his father. He was also heavily influenced by Mexican muralists, particularly José Clemente Orozco, whose fresco Prometheus he would later call "the greatest painting in North America".

In 1930, following his older brother Charles Pollock, he moved to New York City, where they both studied under Thomas Hart Benton at the Art Students League. Benton's rural American subject matter had little influence on Pollock's work, but his rhythmic use of paint and his fierce independence were more lasting. In the early 1930s, Pollock spent a summer touring the Western United States together with Glen Rounds, a fellow art student, and Benton, their teacher.

Career (1936–1954)
Pollock was introduced to the use of liquid paint in 1936 at an experimental workshop in New York City by the Mexican muralist David Alfaro Siqueiros. In the summer, he went to Dartmouth College to study Jose Clemente Orozco's 3,200 square foot mural, “The Epic of American Civilization.” He later used paint pouring as one of several techniques on canvases of the early 1940s, such as Male and Female and Composition with Pouring I. After his move to Springs, New York, he began painting with his canvases laid out on the studio floor and he developed what was later called his "drip" technique.

From 1938 to 1942 Pollock worked for the WPA Federal Art Project. During this time Pollock was trying to deal with his established alcoholism; from 1938 through 1941 he underwent Jungian psychotherapy with Dr. Joseph L. Henderson and later with Dr. Violet Staub de Laszlo in 1941–42. Henderson engaged him through his art, encouraging Pollock to make drawings. Jungian concepts and archetypes were expressed in his paintings. Some historians have hypothesized that Pollock might have had bipolar disorder.
Pollock signed a gallery contract with Peggy Guggenheim in July 1943. He received the commission to create the  Mural (1943) for the entry to her new townhouse. At the suggestion of her friend and advisor Marcel Duchamp, Pollock painted the work on canvas, rather than the wall, so that it would be portable. After seeing the big mural, the art critic Clement Greenberg wrote: "I took one look at it and I thought, 'Now that's great art,' and I knew Jackson was the greatest painter this country had produced." The catalog introducing his first exhibition described Pollock's talent as "volcanic. It has fire. It is unpredictable. It is undisciplined. It spills out of itself in a mineral prodigality, not yet crystallized."

Drip period
Pollock's most famous paintings were made during the "drip period" between 1947 and 1950. He became famous following an August 8, 1949, four-page spread in Life magazine that asked, "Is he the greatest living painter in the United States?" Thanks to the mediation of Alfonso Ossorio, a close friend of Pollock, and the art historian Michel Tapié, the young gallery owner Paul Facchetti, from March 7, 1952, managed to realize the first exhibition of Pollock's works from 1948 to 1951 in his Studio Paul Facchetti in Paris and in Europe. At the peak of his fame, Pollock abruptly abandoned the drip style.  Pollock's drip paintings were influenced by the artist Janet Sobel; the art critic Clement Greenberg would later report that Pollock "admitted" to him that Sobel's work "had made an impression on him."

Pollock's work after 1951 was darker in color, including a collection painted in black on unprimed canvases. These paintings have been referred to as his "Black pourings" and when he exhibited them at the Betty Parsons Gallery in New York, none of them sold. Parsons later sold one to a friend at half the price. These works show Pollock attempting to find a balance between abstraction and depictions of the figure.

He later returned to using color and continued with figurative elements. During this period, Pollock had moved to the Sidney Janis Gallery, a more commercial gallery; the demand for his work from collectors was great. In response to this pressure, along with personal frustration, his alcoholism deepened.

Relationship with Lee Krasner
The two artists met while they both exhibited at the McMillen Gallery in 1942. Krasner was unfamiliar yet intrigued with Pollock's work and went to his apartment, unannounced, to meet him following the gallery exhibition. In October 1945, Pollock and Lee Krasner were married in a church with two witnesses present for the event. In November, they moved out of the city to the Springs area of East Hampton on the south shore of Long Island. With the help of a down-payment loan from Peggy Guggenheim, they bought a wood-frame house and barn at 830 Springs Fireplace Road. Pollock converted the barn into a studio. In that space, he perfected his big "drip" technique of working with paint, with which he would become permanently identified. When the couple found themselves free from work they enjoyed spending their time together cooking and baking, working on the house and garden, and entertaining friends.

Krasner's influence on her husband's art was something critics began to reassess by the latter half of the 1960s due to the rise of feminism at the time. Krasner's extensive knowledge and training in modern art and techniques helped her bring Pollock up to date with what contemporary art should be. Krasner is often considered to have tutored her husband in the tenets of modernistic painting. Pollock was then able to change his style to fit a more organized and cosmopolitan genre of modern art, and Krasner became the one judge he could trust. At the beginning of the two artists' marriage, Pollock would trust his peers' opinions on what did or did not work in his pieces. Krasner was also responsible for introducing him to many collectors, critics, and artists, including Herbert Matter, who would help further his career as an emerging artist. Art dealer John Bernard Myers once said "there would never have been a Jackson Pollock without a Lee Pollock", whereas fellow painter Fritz Bultman referred to Pollock as Krasner's "creation, her Frankenstein", both men recognizing the immense influence Krasner had on Pollock's career.

Jackson Pollock's influence on his wife's artwork is often discussed by art historians. Many people thought that Krasner began to reproduce and reinterpret her husband's chaotic paint splatters in her own work. There are several accounts where Krasner intended to use her own intuition as a way to move towards Pollock's I am nature technique in order to reproduce nature in her art.

Later years and death (1955–1956)

In 1955, Pollock painted Scent and Search, his last two paintings. He did not paint at all in 1956, but was making sculptures at Tony Smith's home: constructions of wire, gauze, and plaster. Shaped by sand-casting, they have heavily textured surfaces similar to what Pollock often created in his paintings.

Pollock and Krasner's relationship began to crumble by 1956, owing to Pollock's continuing alcoholism and infidelity involving another artist, Ruth Kligman. On August 11, 1956, at 10:15 p.m., Pollock died in a single-car crash in his Oldsmobile convertible while driving under the influence of alcohol. At the time, Krasner was visiting friends in Europe; she abruptly returned on hearing the news from a friend. One of the passengers, Edith Metzger, was also killed in the accident, which occurred less than a mile from Pollock's home. The other passenger, Ruth Kligman, survived. In December 1956, four months after his death, Pollock was given a memorial retrospective exhibition at the Museum of Modern Art (MoMA) in New York City. A larger, more comprehensive exhibition of his work was held there in 1967. In 1998 and 1999, his work was honored with large-scale retrospective exhibitions at MoMA and at The Tate in London.

For the rest of her life, his widow Lee Krasner managed his estate and ensured that Pollock's reputation remained strong despite changing art world trends. The couple are buried in Green River Cemetery in Springs with a large boulder marking his grave and a smaller one marking hers.

Artistry

Influence and technique
The work of Thomas Hart Benton, Pablo Picasso and Joan Miró influenced Pollock.
Pollock started using synthetic resin-based paints called alkyd enamels, which at that time was a novel medium. Pollock described this use of household paints, instead of artist's paints, as "a natural growth out of a need". He used hardened brushes, sticks, and even basting syringes as paint applicators. Pollock's technique of pouring and dripping paint is thought to be one of the origins of the term action painting. With this technique, Pollock was able to achieve his own signature style palimpsest paintings, with paints flowing from his chosen tool onto the canvas. By defying the convention of painting on an upright surface, he added a new dimension by being able to view and apply paint to his canvases from all directions.

In 1936, Pollock participated in an experimental workshop run by the Mexican muralist David Alfaro Siqueiros. It was there that he first used liquid enamel paints, which he continued to incorporate in his paintings in the early to mid 1940s, long before he encountered the work of 
the Ukrainian American artist Janet Sobel (1894–1968) (born Jennie Lechovsky). Peggy Guggenheim included Sobel's work in her The Art of This Century Gallery in 1945. Jackson Pollock and art critic Clement Greenberg saw Sobel's work there in 1946 and later Greenberg noted that Sobel was "a direct influence on Jackson Pollock's drip painting technique". In his essay "American-Type Painting", Greenberg noted those works were the first of all-over painting he had seen, and said, "Pollock admitted that these pictures had made an impression on him".

While painting this way, Pollock moved away from figurative representation, and challenged the Western tradition of using easel and brush. He used the force of his whole body to paint, which was expressed on the large canvases. In 1956, Time magazine dubbed Pollock "Jack the Dripper" due to his painting style.

Pollock observed Native American sandpainting demonstrations in the 1940s. Referring to his style of painting on the floor, Pollock stated, "I feel nearer, more a part of the painting, since this way I can walk round it, work from the four sides and literally be in the painting. This is akin to the methods of the Indian sand painters of the West." Other influences on his drip technique include the Mexican muralists and Surrealist automatism. Pollock denied reliance on "the accident"; he usually had an idea of how he wanted a particular work to appear. His technique combined the movement of his body, over which he had control, the viscous flow of paint, the force of gravity, and the absorption of paint into the canvas. It was a mixture of controllable and uncontrollable factors. Flinging, dripping, pouring, and spattering, he would move energetically around the canvas, almost as if in a dance, and would not stop until he saw what he wanted to see.

Austrian artist Wolfgang Paalen's article on totem art of the indigenous people of British Columbia, in which the concept of space in totemist art is considered from an artist's point of view, influenced Pollock as well; Pollock owned a signed and dedicated copy of the Amerindian Number of Paalen's magazine (DYN 4–5, 1943). He had also seen Paalen's surrealist paintings in an exhibition in 1940. Another strong influence must have been Paalen's surrealist fumage technique, which appealed to painters looking for new ways to depict what was called the "unseen" or the "possible". The technique was once demonstrated in Matta's workshop, about which Steven Naifeh reports, "Once, when Matta was demonstrating the Surrealist technique [Paalen's] Fumage, Jackson [Pollock] turned to (Peter) Busa and said in a stage whisper: 'I can do that without the smoke. Pollock's painter friend Fritz Bultman even stated, "It was Wolfgang Paalen who started it all."

In 1950, Hans Namuth, a young photographer, wanted to take pictures—both stills and moving—of Pollock at work. Pollock promised to start a new painting especially for the photographic session, but when Namuth arrived, Pollock apologized and told him the painting was finished.

Namuth said that when he entered the studio:

From naming to numbering
Continuing to evade the viewer's search for figurative elements in his paintings, Pollock abandoned titles and started numbering his works. He said about this, "[L]ook passively and try to receive what the painting has to offer and not bring a subject matter or preconceived idea of what they are to be looking for." His wife said, "He used to give his pictures conventional titles ... but now he simply numbers them. Numbers are neutral. They make people look at a picture for what it is—pure painting."

Critical debate
Pollock's work has been the subject of important critical debates. Critic Robert Coates once derided a number of Pollock's works as "mere unorganized explosions of random energy, and therefore meaningless". Reynold's News, in a 1959 headline, said, "This is not art—it's a joke in bad taste." French abstract painter Jean Hélion, on the other hand, remarked on first seeing a Pollock, "It filled out space going on and on because it did not have a start or end to it." Clement Greenberg supported Pollock's work on formalistic grounds. It fit well with Greenberg's view of art history as a progressive purification in form and elimination of historical content. He considered Pollock's work to be the best painting of its day and the culmination of the Western tradition via Cubism and Cézanne to Manet.

In a 1952 article in ARTnews, Harold Rosenberg coined the term "action painting" and wrote that "what was to go on the canvas was not a picture but an event. The big moment came when it was decided to paint 'just to paint'. The gesture on the canvas was a gesture of liberation from value—political, aesthetic, moral." Many people assumed that he had modeled his "action painter" paradigm on Pollock.
 
The Congress for Cultural Freedom, an organization to promote American culture and values, backed by the Central Intelligence Agency (CIA), sponsored exhibitions of Pollock's work. Some left-wing scholars, including Eva Cockcroft, have argued that the United States government and wealthy elite embraced Pollock and abstract expressionism to place the United States in the forefront of global art and devalue socialist realism. Cockcroft wrote that Pollock became a "weapon of the Cold War".

Pollock described his art as "motion made visible memories, arrested in space".

Legacy

Influence
Pollock's staining into raw canvas was adapted by the Color Field painters Helen Frankenthaler and Morris Louis. Frank Stella made "all-over composition" a hallmark of his works of the 1960s. The Happenings artist Allan Kaprow, sculptors Richard Serra and Eva Hesse, and many contemporary artists have retained Pollock's emphasis on the process of creation; they were influenced by his approach to the process, rather than the look of his work.

In 2004, One: Number 31, 1950 was ranked the eighth-most influential piece of modern art in a poll of 500 artists, curators, critics, and dealers.

In pop culture and media
In 1960, Ornette Coleman's album Free Jazz: A Collective Improvisation featured a Pollock painting, White Light, as its cover artwork.

In the early 1990s, three groups of movie makers were developing Pollock biographical projects, each based on a different source. The project that at first seemed most advanced was a joint venture between Barbra Streisand's Barwood Films and Robert De Niro's TriBeCa Productions (De Niro's parents were friends of Krasner and Pollock). The script, by Christopher Cleveland, was to be based on Jeffrey Potter's 1985 oral biography, To a Violent Grave, a collection of reminiscences by Pollock's friends. Streisand was to play the role of Lee Krasner, and De Niro was to portray Pollock. A second was to be based on Love Affair (1974), a memoir by Ruth Kligman, who was Pollock's lover in the six months before his death. This was to be directed by Harold Becker, with Al Pacino playing Pollock.

In 2000, the biographical film Pollock, based on the Pulitzer Prize-winning biography, Jackson Pollock: An American Saga, directed by and starring Ed Harris, was released. Marcia Gay Harden won the Academy Award for Best Supporting Actress for her portrayal of Lee Krasner. The movie was the project of Harris, who was nominated for the Academy Award for Best Actor. Harris himself painted the works seen in the film. The Pollock-Krasner Foundation did not authorize or collaborate with any production.

In September 2009, the art historian Henry Adams claimed in Smithsonian magazine that Pollock had written his name in his famous painting Mural (1943). The painting is now insured for US$140 million. In 2011, the Republican Iowa State Representative Scott Raecker introduced a bill to force the sale of the artwork, held by the University of Iowa, to fund scholarships, but his bill created such controversy that it was quickly withdrawn.

Art market
In 1973, Number 11, 1952 (also known as Blue Poles) was purchased by the Australian Whitlam government for the National Gallery of Australia for US$2 million (A$1.3 million at the time of payment). At the time, this was the highest price ever paid for a modern painting. The painting is now one of the most popular exhibits in the gallery. It was a centerpiece of the Museum of Modern Art's 1998 retrospective in New York, the first time the painting had been shown in America since its purchase.

In November 2006, Pollock's No. 5, 1948 became the world's most expensive painting, when it was sold privately to an undisclosed buyer for the sum of US$140 million. Another artist record was established in 2004, when No. 12 (1949), a medium-sized drip painting that had been shown in the United States Pavilion at the 1950 Venice Biennale, fetched US$11.7 million at Christie's, New York. In 2012, Number 28, 1951, one of the artist's combinations of drip and brushwork in shades of silvery gray with red, yellow, and shots of blue and white, also sold at Christie's, New York, for US$20.5 million—US$23 million with fees—within its estimated range of US$20 million to US$30 million.

In 2013, Pollock's Number 19 (1948) was sold by Christie's for a reported US$58,363,750 during an auction that ultimately reached US$495 million total sales in one night, which Christie's reports as a record to date as the most expensive auction of contemporary art.

In February 2016, Bloomberg News reported that Kenneth C. Griffin had purchased Jackson Pollock's 1948 painting Number 17A for US$200 million, from David Geffen.

Authenticity issues
The Pollock-Krasner Authentication Board was created by the Pollock-Krasner Foundation in 1990 to evaluate newly found works for an upcoming supplement to the 1978 catalogue. In the past, however, the Pollock-Krasner Foundation has declined to be involved in authentication cases.

In 2006, a documentary, Who the *$&% Is Jackson Pollock?, was made concerning Teri Horton, a truck driver who bought an abstract painting for five dollars at a thrift store in California in 1992. This work may be a lost Pollock painting, but its authenticity is debated.

Untitled 1950, which the New York-based Knoedler Gallery had sold in 2007 for $17 million to Pierre Lagrange, a London hedge-fund multimillionaire, was subject to an authenticity suit before the United States District Court for the Southern District of New York. Done in the painter's classic drip-and-splash style and signed "J. Pollock", the modest-sized painting (15 by 28 1/2 in) was found to contain yellow paint pigments not commercially available until about 1970. The suit was settled in a confidential agreement in 2012.

Fractal computer analysis
In 1999, physicist and artist Richard Taylor used computer analysis to show similarities between Pollock's painted patterns and fractals (patterns that recur on multiple size scales) found in natural scenery, reflecting Pollock's own words: "I am nature". His research team labelled Pollock's style fractal expressionism.

In 2003, 24 Pollockesque paintings and drawings were found in a locker in Wainscott, New York. In 2005, The Pollock-Krasner Foundation requested a fractal analysis to be used for the first time in an authenticity dispute. Researchers at the University of Oregon used the technique to identify differences between the patterns in the six disputed paintings analyzed and those in 14 established Pollocks. Pigment analysis of the paintings by researchers at Harvard University showed the presence in one painting of a synthetic pigment that was not patented until the 1980s, and materials in two others that were not available in Pollock's lifetime.

In 2007, a traveling museum exhibition of the paintings was mounted and was accompanied by a comprehensive book, Pollock Matters, written by Ellen G. Landau, one of the four sitting scholars from the former Pollock Krasner Foundation authentication panel from the 1990s, and Claude Cernuschi, a scholar in Abstract Expressionism. In the book, Landau demonstrates the many connections between the family who owns the paintings and Jackson Pollock during his lifetime to place the paintings in what she believes to be their proper historic context. Landau also presents the forensic findings of Harvard University and presents possible explanations for the forensic inconsistencies that were found in three of the 24 paintings. However, the scientist who invented one of the modern pigments dismissed the possibility that Pollock used this paint as being "unlikely to the point of fantasy".

Subsequently, over 10 scientific groups have performed fractal analysis on over 50 of Pollock's works. A 2015 study that used fractal analysis as one of its techniques achieved a 93% success rate distinguishing real from fake Pollocks. Current research of Fractal Expressionism focuses on human response to viewing fractals. Cognitive neuroscientists have shown that Pollock's fractals induce the same stress-reduction in observers as computer-generated fractals and naturally-occurring fractals.

Archives
Lee Krasner donated Pollock's papers to the Archives of American Art in 1983. They were later archived with her own papers. The Archives of American Art also houses the Charles Pollock papers, which include correspondence, photographs, and other files relating to his brother Jackson.

A separate organization, the Pollock-Krasner Foundation, was established in 1985. The foundation functions as the official estate for both Pollock and his widow, but also under the terms of Krasner's will, serves "to assist individual working artists of merit with financial need". The U.S. copyright representative for the Pollock-Krasner Foundation is the Artists Rights Society.

The Pollock-Krasner House and Studio is owned and administered by the Stony Brook Foundation, a nonprofit affiliate of Stony Brook University. Regular tours of the house and studio occur from May through October.

List of major works

 (1942) Male and Female Philadelphia Museum of Art
 (1942) Stenographic Figure Museum of Modern Art
 (1942) The Moon Woman Peggy Guggenheim Collection
 (1943) Mural University of Iowa Museum of Art, given by Peggy Guggenheim
 (1943) The She-Wolf Museum of Modern Art (See right)
 (1943) Blue (Moby Dick) Ohara Museum of Art
 (1945) Night Mist Norton Museum of Art
 (1945) Troubled Queen Museum of Fine Arts, Boston
 (1946) Eyes in the Heat Peggy Guggenheim Collection, Venice
 (1946) The Key Art Institute of Chicago
 (1946) The Tea Cup Collection Frieder Burda
 (1946) Shimmering Substance, from The Sounds In The Grass Museum of Modern Art
 (1947) Portrait of H.M. University of Iowa Museum of Art, given by Peggy Guggenheim.
 (1947) Full Fathom Five Museum of Modern Art
 (1947) Cathedral Dallas Museum of Art
 (1947) Enchanted Forest Peggy Guggenheim Collection
 (1947) Lucifer The Anderson Collection at Stanford University
 (1947) Sea Change Seattle Art Museum, given by Peggy Guggenheim
 (1948) Painting
 (1948) Number 5 (4 ft x 8 ft) Private collection
 (1948) Number 8 Neuburger Museum at the State University of New York at Purchase
 (1948) Number 13A: Arabesque Yale University Art Gallery, New Haven, Connecticut
 (1948) Composition (White, Black, Blue and Red on White) New Orleans Museum of Art
 (1948) Summertime: Number 9A Tate Modern
 (1948) "Number 19" 
 (1949) Number 1 Museum of Contemporary Art, Los Angeles
 (1949) Number 3 Hirshhorn Museum and Sculpture Garden, Washington, D.C.
 (1949) Number 10 Museum of Fine Arts, Boston
 (1949) Number 11 Indiana University Art Museum Bloomington, Indiana
 (1950) Number 1, 1950 (Lavender Mist) National Gallery of Art
 (1950) Mural on Indian red ground, 1950 Tehran Museum of Contemporary Art
 (1950) Autumn Rhythm (Number 30), 1950 Metropolitan Museum of Art
 (1950) Number 29, 1950 National Gallery of Canada
 (1950) Number 32, Kunstsammlung Nordrhein-Westfalen, Düsseldorf, BRD
 (1950) One: Number 31, 1950 Museum of Modern Art
 (1951) Number 7 National Gallery of Art
 (1951) Black and White (Number 6) San Francisco Museum of Modern Art
 (1952) Convergence Albright-Knox Art Gallery
 (1952) Blue Poles: No. 11, 1952 National Gallery of Australia
 (1952) Number 12, 1952 Governor Nelson A. Rockefeller Empire State Plaza Art Collection
 (1953) Portrait and a Dream Dallas Museum of Art
 (1953) Easter and the Totem The Museum of Modern Art
 (1953) Ocean Greyness Solomon R. Guggenheim Museum
 (1953) The Deep Centre Georges Pompidou

Tribute

On 28 January 2019, Google Doodle celebrated Jackson Pollock’s Birthday.

References

Further reading

mcah.columbia.edu

External links

Exhibition-'Memories Arrested' 2012
Pollock-Krasner House and Study Center
Pollock-Krasner Foundation

Pollock and The Law
National Gallery of Art web feature, includes highlights of Pollock's career, numerous examples of his work, photographs and motion footage of Pollock, plus an in-depth discussion of his 1950 painting Lavender Mist
Blue Poles at the NGA
Fractal Expressionism – the fractal qualities of Pollock's drip paintings.
Jackson Pollock Papers at the Smithsonian's Archives of American Art
"Jackson Pollock, John Cage and William Burroughs", talk at MOMA
pictures of Pollock, slideshow Life Magazine
Works by Jackson Pollock (public domain in Canada)

Museum links

The Solomon R. Guggenheim Foundation
Los Angeles County Museum of Art (LACMA), Los Angeles, California
Museum of Contemporary Art (MOCA), Los Angeles, California
Jackson Pollock at the Israel Museum, Jerusalem

 
Abstract painters
American abstract artists
Abstract expressionist artists
20th-century American painters
American male painters
1912 births
1956 deaths
American people of Scottish descent
American people of Irish descent
American people of Scotch-Irish descent
Art Students League of New York alumni
Painters from California
Painters from New York City
Artists from Wyoming
People from Springs, New York
People from Chico, California
People from Echo Park, Los Angeles
People from Cody, Wyoming
Federal Art Project artists
Alcohol-related deaths in New York (state)
Road incident deaths in New York (state)
Burials at Green River Cemetery
Sibling artists